Tordyliopsis is a monotypic genus of flowering plants belonging to the family Apiaceae. Its only species is Tordyliopsis brunonis. Its native range is Himalaya to Tibet.

References

Apioideae
Monotypic Apioideae genera